Vishākhā is a nakshatra in Indian astronomy spread in Tula or Libra (The 7th House of Natural Vedic Astrology). In Hindu mythology, Vishākhā is a daughter of the king Daksha. She is one of the twenty-seven daughters of Daksha, who married the moon-god Chandra. Vishākhā is the sixteenth nakshatra of the  zodiac, ruled by the planet Jupiter Brihaspati or Guru, It is also supposed to be the birth star of the goddess Sita.

Notable people and entities named Vishākhā 

 Vishakha Singh (born 1986), Indian film actress, producer and entrepreneur
 Vishakha Raut, a Shiv Sena Politician from Mumbai, former Mayor of Brihanmumbai Municipal Corporation
 Vishakha N. Desai, an Asia scholar with a focus on art, culture, policy, and women's rights
Vishakha Vikramaneni (born 1999),Indian Film and Tv artist and voice artist
Visakhapatnam, city in Andhra Pradesh
Visakha FC, Cambodian football club

See also
Gopi, Vishaka is also one of the main gopis in Krishna lila, Krishna's muses in Goloka Vrndavana

References

Nakshatra